The 33rd United States Colored Infantry Regiment was a U.S.C.T. infantry regiment of the Union Army during the American Civil War. It was re-organized from the colored 1st South Carolina Infantry in February 1864. It served with the Department of the South in South Carolina until it was mustered out on January 31, 1866.

See also
List of United States Colored Troops Civil War units

Sources
 South Carolina Civil War soldiers

External links
 

United States Colored Troops Civil War units and formations
Units and formations of the Union Army from South Carolina
Military units and formations established in 1864
1864 establishments in South Carolina
Military units and formations disestablished in 1866